Iván Gómez Romero (born 2 February 1980 in Barcelona, Catalonia) is a Spanish retired footballer who played as a goalkeeper.

External links

1980 births
Living people
Footballers from Barcelona
Spanish footballers
Association football goalkeepers
Segunda División players
Segunda División B players
Tercera División players
RCD Espanyol B footballers
UE Cornellà players
Deportivo Alavés B players
Burgos CF footballers
Girona FC players
CD Mirandés footballers
CE Sabadell FC footballers